Gardar is an unincorporated community in Pembina County, in the U.S. state of North Dakota.

As of 2016, its population is 90.

History
Gardar was founded ca. 1878, and was originally built up chiefly by Icelanders. A post office was established at Gardar in 1881, and remained in operation until 1984.

References

Unincorporated communities in Pembina County, North Dakota
Unincorporated communities in North Dakota